Pasco may refer to:

People 
 Pasco (name)

Places

Australia 
 Pasco Island Group, Tasmania:
 Middle Pasco Islands
 North Pasco Island
 South Pasco Island

Argentina 
 Pasco (Buenos Aires Metro), a station

Peru 
 Cerro de Pasco, city
 Pasco Province
 Department of Pasco

United States 
 Pasco, Ohio
 Pasco, Washington, one of the Tri-Cities
 Pasco County, Florida

Other uses 
 PASCO, the airline callsign of Pacific Coastal Airlines

See also 
 Pascoe (disambiguation)